Zuzanna Stefania Siwy (born 1972) is a Polish–American chemist at the University of California, Irvine. Her research considers synthetic nanopores and their application in ionic devices. She is a Fellow of the American Physical Society, American Association for the Advancement of Science and Foundation for Polish Science.

Early life and education 
Siwy is from Poland. She studied chemistry at the Silesian University of Technology in Poland. She graduated with a master's degree in polymer technology in 1995, before completing a doctorate in chemical sciences in 1997. Siwy was a postdoctoral scholar at the University of Florida.

Research and career 
Siwy joined the faculty at the University of California, Irvine in 2005.  In 2012 she was made Professor of Chemical Physics.  She studies synthetic nanopores, which she looks to use as templates for biomimetic channels as well as ionic diodes and transistors.

Awards and honours 

 2000 Elected Fellow of the Foundation for Polish Science
 2001 Elected Fellow of the Alexander von Humboldt Foundation
 2007 Alfred P. Sloan Foundation Fellow
 2008 National Science Foundation CAREER Award
 2009 Friedrich Wilhelm Bessel Research Award
 2009 Presidential Early Career Award for Scientists and Engineers
 2012 University of California, Irvine Distinguished Mid-Career Faculty Award for Research
 2013 Elected Fellow of the American Physical Society
 2019 Elected Fellow of the American Association for the Advancement of Science

Selected publications

References 

1972 births
Living people
American people of Polish descent
Polish scientists
Polish women scientists
Polish women chemists
University of California, Irvine faculty
Fellows of the American Physical Society
Fellows of the American Association for the Advancement of Science
Inorganic chemists